Justice Morrill may refer to:

Amos Morrill (1809–1884), associate justice of the Texas Supreme Court
John A. Morrill (1855–1945), associate justice of the Maine Supreme Judicial Court